Milobar is a Croatian surname. Notable people with the surname include:

 Karola Maier Milobar (1876–?), Croatian physician
 Peter Milobar (born 1970), Canadian politician

Croatian surnames